ADEQ may refer to:

 Arkansas Department of Environmental Quality
 Arizona Department of Environmental Quality